Blunck is a surname. Notable people with this surname include:

 Aaron Blunck (born 1996), American freestyle skier
 Andreas Blunck (1871–1933), German politician
 Christian Blunck (born 1968), German field hockey player
 Ditlev Blunck (1798–1853), Danish-German painter
 Hans-Friedrich Blunck (1888–1961), German jurist
 Timo Blunck (born 1962), German musician
 Øivind Blunck (born 1950), Norwegian actor